Tam Kỳ Stadium is a multi-use stadium located in Tam Kỳ, Quảng Nam Province, Vietnam. The stadium holds around 15,000 people and is mostly used for football matches. It is currently the home stadium of QNK Quang Nam F.C.

History

References

External links
http://www.betstudy.com/soccer-stats/stadium/3542/san-vn-ng-tam-k-tam-ky-stadium/

Buildings and structures in Quảng Nam province
Football venues in Vietnam